The Regional Representative Council (DPD; alternatively translatable as the House of Regions or the House of Regional Representatives or the Senate of Indonesia), is one of two parliamentary chambers in Indonesia. Together with the Dewan Perwakilan Rakyat, (DPR), it makes up the Indonesian national legislative body, the Majelis Permusyawaratan Rakyat (MPR). Under Indonesia's constitution, the authority of the DPD is limited to areas related to regional governments and can only propose and give advice on bills to the DPR. Unlike the DPR, the DPD has no direct law-making power. Its members are usually called senators instead of DPD members.

History
The idea of regional representation in parliament was initially accommodated in the original version of the 1945 Constitution, with the concept of Utusan Daerah (Regional Representatives) in the MPR, along with Utusan Golongan (Group Representatives) and members of the DPR. This is regulated in Article 2 of the constitution, which states that "The MPR consists of members of the DPR plus representatives from regions and groups, according to the rules established by law". This loose arrangement was then further regulated in various laws and regulations.

In the Constitution of the United States of Indonesia enacted in 1949, the idea was realized in the form of Senat Republik Indonesia Serikat (Senate of the United States of Indonesia), representing the states and working side by side with the DPR.

As a replacement of Utusan Daerah, the DPD was created by the third amendment to the 1945 Constitution enacted on 9 November 2001 in a move towards bicameralism. The DPD does not have the revising powers of an upper house like the United States Senate. Article 22D restricts the DPD to dealing with bills on "regional autonomy, the relationship of central and local government, formation, expansion and merger of regions, management of natural resources and other economic resources, and Bills related to the financial balance between the centre and the regions."

The International Foundation for Electoral Systems conducted a tracking survey in the Indonesian legislative elections in 2004 which showed that not all voters knew how to vote for candidates for the new Regional Representative Council, or were even aware of its existence. The first 128 elected DPD members were sworn in for the first time on 1 October 2004.

The DPD is not a true upper house, because power of the DPD is relatively weak compared to the older chamber, the DPR, notably it has no direct law-making or the power to veto bills. According to Indonesian constitutional scholar Jimly Asshiddiqie, the relative weakness of the DPD was a result of a compromise in the committee responsible for the constitutional amendment. The reformist faction wanted a strong second chamber in addition to the existing DPR in order to strengthen checks and balances, but this was opposed by the conservative faction.

Membership 

Article 22C of the Constitution rules that all members of the DPD are elected through the same Legislative Election every five years, along with the members of DPR. The total number of members is limited so that it does not exceed one third of that of DPR. Each province of Indonesia elects 4 members to the DPD on a non-partisan basis using Single non-transferable voting, although many candidates in the April 2004 election had links to the parties represented in the People's Representative Council, the Dewan Perwakilan Rakyat or DPR. The members represents the interests of their provinces, therefore the DPD can be seen as a reform of the utusan daerah (regional representatives) of the MPR in Suharto era, which were appointed to the MPR at the president's discretion.

Powers and structure
The DPD can propose regional bills to the DPR and must be heard on any regional bill proposed by DPR.

Speakers and Deputy Speakers

Miscellaneous
The acronym DPD is a common one in Indonesia. In political parties, it usually stands for Dewan Pimpinan Daerah (Local Leadership Council) and seated at each provincial capital. It should not be confused with the legislative body.

References

Notes

External links

 DPD homepage (Indonesian)

Indonesia
Government of Indonesia
People's Consultative Assembly